My Own Man is a 2014 documentary film taking a look at what it means to be a man in today's society. David Sampliner's search starts when he learns he’s about to become a father to a baby boy and is unsure of his abilities to raise his son into manhood. The story of the 40-year-old's search which includes vocal lessons, warrior weekends and hunting before turning into a deeper look at his relationship with his own father. The film is executive produced by Edward Norton.

Cast 
 David Sampliner

References

External links
 
 
 

2014 films
2014 documentary films
Netflix original documentary films
2010s English-language films